Mittleres Nessetal is a former Verwaltungsgemeinschaft ("collective municipality") in the district of Gotha, in Thuringia, Germany. The seat of the Verwaltungsgemeinschaft was in Goldbach. It was disbanded in January 2019, when 11 of its 12 municipalities were merged into the new municipality Nessetal.

The Verwaltungsgemeinschaft Mittleres Nessetal consisted of the following municipalities:
Ballstädt 
Brüheim 
Bufleben
Friedrichswerth
Goldbach
Haina 
Hochheim 
Remstädt 
Sonneborn 
Wangenheim
Warza 
Westhausen

References

Former Verwaltungsgemeinschaften in Thuringia